Max Suel da Cruz or Maxwell (born October 29, 1986) is a Brazilian footballer who currently plays for Persiwa Wamena in the Indonesia Super League.

References

External links
Max Suel da Cruz at Liga Indonesia

1986 births
Living people
Brazilian footballers
Brazilian expatriate footballers
Brazilian expatriate sportspeople in Hong Kong
Brazilian expatriate sportspeople in Indonesia
Expatriate footballers in Hong Kong
Expatriate footballers in Indonesia
Liga 1 (Indonesia) players
Persiwa Wamena players
Association football forwards
Footballers from São Paulo (state)